In classical mechanics, Routh's procedure or Routhian mechanics is a hybrid formulation of Lagrangian mechanics and Hamiltonian mechanics developed by Edward John Routh. Correspondingly, the Routhian is the function which replaces both the Lagrangian and Hamiltonian functions. Routhian mechanics is equivalent to Lagrangian mechanics and Hamiltonian mechanics, and introduces no new physics. It offers an alternative way to solve mechanical problems.

Definitions
The Routhian, like the Hamiltonian, can be obtained from a Legendre transform of the Lagrangian, and has a similar mathematical form to the Hamiltonian, but is not exactly the same. The difference between the Lagrangian, Hamiltonian, and Routhian functions are their variables. For a given set of generalized coordinates representing the degrees of freedom in the system, the Lagrangian is a function of the coordinates and velocities, while the Hamiltonian is a function of the coordinates and momenta.

The Routhian differs from these functions in that some coordinates are chosen to have corresponding generalized velocities, the rest to have corresponding generalized momenta. This choice is arbitrary, and can be done to simplify the problem. It also has the consequence that the Routhian equations are exactly the Hamiltonian equations for some coordinates and corresponding momenta, and the Lagrangian equations for the rest of the coordinates and their velocities. In each case the Lagrangian and Hamiltonian functions are replaced by a single function, the Routhian. The full set thus has the advantages of both sets of equations, with the convenience of splitting one set of coordinates to the Hamilton equations, and the rest to the Lagrangian equations.

In the case of Lagrangian mechanics, the generalized coordinates , ... and the corresponding velocities , and possibly time , enter the Lagrangian,

where the overdots denote time derivatives.

In Hamiltonian mechanics, the generalized coordinates  and the corresponding generalized momenta  and possibly time, enter the Hamiltonian,

where the second equation is the definition of the generalized momentum  corresponding to the coordinate  (partial derivatives are denoted using ). The velocities  are expressed as functions of their corresponding momenta by inverting their defining relation.

where again the generalized velocity  is to be expressed as a function of generalized momentum  via its defining relation. The choice of which  coordinates are to have corresponding momenta, out of the  coordinates, is arbitrary.

The above is used by Landau and Lifshitz, and Goldstein. Some authors may define the Routhian to be the negative of the above definition.

where · is the dot product defined on the tuples, for the specific example appearing here:

Equations of motion

For reference, the Euler-Lagrange equations for  degrees of freedom are a set of  coupled second order ordinary differential equations in the coordinates

where , and the Hamiltonian equations for  degrees of freedom are a set of  coupled first order ordinary differential equations in the coordinates and momenta

Below, the Routhian equations of motion are obtained in two ways, in the process other useful derivatives are found that can be used elsewhere.

Two degrees of freedom

(The generalization to any number of degrees of freedom follows exactly the same procedure as with two). The Lagrangian of the system will have the form

This change of variables in the differentials is the Legendre transformation. Using the definition of generalized momentum and Lagrange's equation for the coordinate :

we have

to obtain the differential of a new function in terms of the new set of variables:

Introducing the Routhian

where again the velocity  is a function of the momentum , we have

but from the above definition, the differential of the Routhian is

and Lagrange's equation for the coordinate 

which follow from

and taking the total time derivative of the second equation and equating to the first. Notice the Routhian replaces the Hamiltonian and Lagrangian functions in all the equations of motion.

Any number of degrees of freedom

For  coordinates as defined above, with Routhian

The derivatives are

The first two are identically the Hamiltonian equations. Equating the total time derivative of the fourth set of equations with the third (for each value of ) gives the Lagrangian equations. The fifth is just the same relation between time partial derivatives as before. To summarize

Energy

Since the Lagrangian has the same units as energy, the units of the Routhian are also energy. In SI units this is the Joule.

Taking the total time derivative of the Lagrangian leads to the general result

If the Lagrangian is independent of time, the partial time derivative of the Lagrangian is zero, so the quantity under the total time derivative in brackets must be a constant, it is the total energy of the system

(If there are external fields interacting with the constituents of the system, they can vary throughout space but not time).

In the case that  and the Routhian is explicitly time-independent, then , that is, the Routhian equals the energy of the system.

If the Routhian has explicit time dependence, the total energy of the system is not constant. The general result is

Cyclic coordinates
Often the Routhian approach may offer no advantage, but one notable case where this is useful is when a system has cyclic coordinates (also called "ignorable coordinates"), by definition those coordinates which do not appear in the original Lagrangian. The Lagrangian equations are powerful results, used frequently in theory and practice, since the equations of motion in the coordinates are easy to set up. However, if cyclic coordinates occur there will still be equations to solve for all the coordinates, including the cyclic coordinates despite their absence in the Lagrangian. The Hamiltonian equations are useful theoretical results, but less useful in practice because coordinates and momenta are related together in the solutions - after solving the equations the coordinates and momenta must be eliminated from each other. Nevertheless, the Hamiltonian equations are perfectly suited to cyclic coordinates because the equations in the cyclic coordinates trivially vanish, leaving only the equations in the non cyclic coordinates.

The Routhian approach has the best of both approaches, because cyclic coordinates can be split off to the Hamiltonian equations and eliminated, leaving behind the non cyclic coordinates to be solved from the Lagrangian equations. Overall fewer equations need to be solved compared to the Lagrangian approach.

The Routhian formulation is useful for systems with cyclic coordinates, because by definition those coordinates do not enter , and hence .

With these constants substituted into the Routhian,  is a function of only the non cyclic coordinates and velocities (and in general time also)

The  Hamiltonian equation in the cyclic coordinates automatically vanishes,

and the  Lagrangian equations are in the non cyclic coordinates

Thus the problem has been reduced to solving the Lagrangian equations in the non cyclic coordinates, with the advantage of the Hamiltonian equations cleanly removing the cyclic coordinates. Using those solutions, the equations for can be integrated to compute .

If we are interested in how the cyclic coordinates change with time, the equations for the generalized velocities corresponding to the cyclic coordinates can be integrated.

Examples

Routh's procedure does not guarantee the equations of motion will be simple, however it will lead to fewer equations.

Central potential in spherical coordinates 

One general class of mechanical systems with cyclic coordinates are those with central potentials, because potentials of this form only have dependence on radial separations and no dependence on angles.

Consider a particle of mass  under the influence of a central potential  in spherical polar coordinates 

Notice  is cyclic, because it does not appear in the Lagrangian.

The Routhian can be taken to be

The  equation is

and the  equation is

The Routhian approach has obtained two coupled nonlinear equations.

The  equation is

the  equation is

the  equation is

Symmetric mechanical systems

Spherical pendulum

Consider the spherical pendulum, a mass  (known as a "pendulum bob") attached to a rigid rod of length  of negligible mass, subject to a local gravitational field . The system rotates with angular velocity  which is not constant.

The Lagrangian is

which again is physically the angular momentum of the system about the vertical. The angle  and angular velocity  vary with time, but the angular momentum is constant. The Routhian is

The  equation is found from the Lagrangian equations

or simplifying by introducing the constants

gives

This equation resembles the simple nonlinear pendulum equation, because it can swing through the vertical axis, with an additional term to account for the rotation about the vertical axis (the constant  is related to the angular momentum ).

Applying the Lagrangian approach there are two nonlinear coupled equations to solve.

The  equation is

and the  equation is

Heavy symmetrical top

The heavy symmetrical top of mass  has Lagrangian

where  are the Euler angles,  is the angle between the vertical -axis and the top's -axis,  is the rotation of the top about its own -axis, and  the azimuthal of the top's -axis around the vertical -axis. The principal moments of inertia are  about the top's own  axis,  about the top's own  axes, and  about the top's own -axis. Since the top is symmetric about its -axis, . Here the simple relation for local gravitational potential energy  is used where  is the acceleration due to gravity, and the centre of mass of the top is a distance  from its tip along its -axis.

The angles  are cyclic. The constant momenta are the angular momenta of the top about its axis and its precession about the vertical, respectively:

From these, eliminating :

we have

The Routhian can be taken to be

and since

we have

The first term is constant, and can be ignored since only the derivatives of R will enter the equations of motion. The simplified Routhian, without loss of information, is thus

or by introducing the constants

a simpler form of the equation is obtained

Although the equation is highly nonlinear, there is only one equation to solve for, it was obtained directly, and the cyclic coordinates are not involved.

The  equation is

the  equation is

and the  equation is

Velocity-dependent potentials

Classical charged particle in a uniform magnetic field 

Consider a classical charged particle of mass  and electric charge  in a static (time-independent) uniform (constant throughout space) magnetic field . The Lagrangian for a charged particle in a general electromagnetic field given by the magnetic potential  and electric potential  is

It is convenient to use cylindrical coordinates , so that

In this case of no electric field, the electric potential is zero, and we can choose the axial gauge for the magnetic potential

and the Lagrangian is

Notice this potential has an effectively cylindrical symmetry (although it also has angular velocity dependence), since the only spatial dependence is on the radial length from an imaginary cylinder axis.

so the velocities are

The angular momentum about the z axis is not , but the quantity , which is not conserved due to the contribution from the magnetic field. The canonical momentum  is the conserved quantity. It is still the case that  is the linear or translational momentum along the z axis, which is also conserved.

The radial component  and angular velocity  can vary with time, but  is constant, and since  is constant it follows  is constant. The Routhian can take the form

where in the last line, the  term is a constant and can be ignored without loss of continuity. The Lagrangian equation in 

is by direct calculation

which after collecting terms is

and simplifying further by introducing the constants

the differential equation is

The motion of the particle in this system is helicoidal, with the axial motion uniform (constant) but the radial and angular components varying in a spiral according to the equation of motion derived above. If r is constant, the angular velocity is also constant according to the conserved .

The  equation is

the  equation is

and the  equation is

See also

 Calculus of variations
Phase space
Configuration space
Many-body problem
Rigid body mechanics

Footnotes

Notes

References

Classical mechanics
Theoretical physics
Mathematical physics
Applied mathematics

ru:Функция Рауса